The following elections occurred in the year 1935.

Asia
 1935 Philippine legislative election
 1935 Philippine presidential election

Europe
 1935 Czechoslovakian parliamentary election
 1935 Czechoslovak presidential election
 1935 Danish Folketing election + 1935 Danish local elections
 Germany: 1935 Saar status referendum
 Greece: 
 legislative election
 monarchy referendum
 1935 Hungarian parliamentary election
 Netherlands: elections of States-Provincial (:nl:Provinciale Statenverkiezingen)
 Northern Ireland: 1935 United Kingdom general election in Northern Ireland
 1935 Liechtenstein electoral system referendum
 1935 Polish legislative election
 1935 Portuguese presidential election
 1935 Slovak provincial election
 Switzerland: four referendums
 1935 Turkish general election
 1935 Yugoslavian parliamentary election

United Kingdom
 1935 Combined Scottish Universities by-election
 1935 Dumfriesshire by-election
 1935 Eastbourne by-election
 1935 United Kingdom general election
 1935 Labour Party leadership election
 List of MPs elected in the 1935 United Kingdom general election
 1935 Liverpool Wavertree by-election

North America
 1935 Guatemalan Constituent Assembly election
 1935 Guatemalan presidential term referendum
 1935 Salvadoran presidential election

Canada
 1935 Canadian federal election
 1935 Alberta general election
 1935 Edmonton municipal election
 1935 New Brunswick general election
 1935 Ottawa municipal election
 1935 Prince Edward Island general election
 1935 Quebec general election
 1935 Toronto municipal election

Oceania
 1935 New Zealand general election

Australia
 1935 New South Wales state election
 1935 Queensland state election

See also
 :Category:1935 elections

1935
Elections